Admiral Algernon Percy, 4th Duke of Northumberland,  (15 December 1792 – 12 February 1865), styled Lord Algernon Percy from birth until 1816 and known as The Lord Prudhoe between 1816 and 1847, was a British naval commander, explorer and Conservative politician.

Early life
Northumberland was the second son of General Hugh Percy, 2nd Duke of Northumberland, and his second wife Frances Julia, daughter of Peter Burrell. He was educated at Eton and St John's College, Cambridge.

Naval career
Northumberland entered the Royal Navy in March 1805, aged 12, on board HMS Tribune and served in the Napoleonic Wars. In 1815, when only 22, he was promoted to captain, taking command of HMS Cossack in August, and commanding her until she was broken up some 10 months later. The following year, aged 23, he was raised to the peerage as Baron Prudhoe, of Prudhoe Castle in the County of Northumberland (Prudhoe being a town in Northumberland). Between 1826 and 1829 he was part of an expedition to Egypt, Nubia and The Levant. In 1834, he travelled to the Cape of Good Hope with John Herschel to study the southern constellations.

Northumberland was president of the National Institution for the Preservation of Life from Shipwreck from 1851 to 1865 (partly due to encouragement by George Palmer) during which time he undertook a reorganisation, changing its name to the Royal National Lifeboat Institution in October 1854. In 1851 he offered a prize of £200 for a new design of self-righting lifeboat, won by James Beeching, which became the standard model for the new Royal National Lifeboat Institution fleet.

In 1862 he became a full admiral in the Royal Navy on the Reserved List.

Political career
Northumberland succeeded his childless elder brother in the dukedom in 1847. In 1852 he was sworn of the Privy Council and appointed First Lord of the Admiralty, with a seat in the cabinet, by the Earl of Derby, a post he held until the fall of the government in December 1852. In 1853 he was made a Knight of the Garter.

Personal life
Northumberland married, aged 49, Lady Eleanor Grosvenor, daughter of Richard Grosvenor, 2nd Marquess of Westminster, on 25 August 1842 at St George's, Hanover Square. They had no children. As a result of gout in his right hand, he died in February 1865, aged 72 at Alnwick Castle and was buried in the Northumberland Vault, within Westminster Abbey. He was succeeded in his titles by his cousin, George Percy, 2nd Earl of Beverley, except for the barony of Percy, which passed through the female line to his great-nephew, John Stewart-Murray, 7th Duke of Atholl. The Duchess of Northumberland died on 4 May 1911.

He was a fellow of the Royal Society, the Society of Antiquaries, the Royal Geographical Society, the Royal Astronomical Society, president of the Royal United Services Institute and the Royal Institution, a director of the British Institution and a trustee of the British Museum.

Northumberland was a good friend of Arctic explorer Sir John Franklin, and Prudhoe Bay, on the north coast of Alaska, was named after him.

See also

References

External links 
 

1792 births
1865 deaths
People educated at Eton College
Alumni of St John's College, Cambridge
304
Knights of the Garter
Lords of the Admiralty
Algernon Percy, 04th Duke of Northumberland
Fellows of the Royal Society
Burials at Westminster Abbey
British landowners
Fellows of the Royal Geographical Society
Members of the Privy Council of the United Kingdom
Peers of the United Kingdom created by George III
19th-century British businesspeople
Surtees Society